Anastasiia Gorbunova (born 19 May 1995) is an alpine skier from Ukraine.

Performances

References

External links

1995 births
Living people
Ukrainian female alpine skiers
Alpine skiers at the 2012 Winter Youth Olympics
21st-century Ukrainian women